Coachella Valley High School is a public high school for grades 9–12. It is located in Thermal, California. The District includes grade and middle school sites to accommodate a fast-growing population of the area. The population is 90% Hispanic and consists mainly of residents from Coachella. Many students also come from areas such as Indio and Thermal.

History
The high school was opened in September 1910 after  of desert brush land was donated. Coachella Valley High School is the oldest public school in the Coachella Valley. It was incorporated into the Coachella Valley Unified School District in 1973 to include a high school instead of only elementary schools in nearby Coachella. A second high school, Desert Mirage High School opened in 2003 to ease overcrowding which peaked at 2,500 in the early 2000s.

The school's location was decided on because it was the central point of the Coachella Valley. In 2002, social studies teacher Chauncey Veatch was honored as National Teacher of the Year.

Arab mascot controversy
The school mascot, "Arabs", was named in the 1930s to honor the once large Arab colony involved in the date palm growing industry. The school took the position that the name was a "gift" to the Arab peoples for their contribution to the economy of the Coachella Valley, not as a foreign racial symbol.

In 2002, Coachella Valley High School officials had a meeting to determine whether to rename the mascot out of concern it might produce negative stereotypes against Arabs and Middle Eastern people, after the September 11 terrorist attacks.  They decided to keep the mascot name.

In November 2013, the American Arab Anti-Discrimination Committee described the mascot as an offensive stereotype, and began an online petition to get the school to change it.

In April 2014, the committee was working to keep the Arab mascot, and to develop an image that represented the fierce warrior history of the mascot in a way that would not be considered an offensive stereotypical caricature. In addition, the students and staff were working to add in an Arab History component.

In August 2014, it was reported that the school had decided to drop the original "Arabs" mascot.

On September 9, 2014, the school board voted unanimously to adopt new logo and mascot, the "Mighty Arab." The decision was made with the approval of the American-Arab Anti-Discrimination Committee.

Athletics
Sports teams compete in the Desert Valley League, in which the school is will be the largest school in the league. Coachella Valley High School's main athletic competition (rival) is Indio High School.

Cheerleading (Varsity, Jr. Varsity, & Freshman)
Football (Varsity, Jr. Varsity, & Freshman)
Volleyball (Varsity, Jr. Varsity, & Freshman)
Boys Cross Country (Varsity/Jr. Varsity)
Girls Cross Country (Varsity/Jr. Varsity)
Boys Soccer (Varsity/Jr. Varsity)
Girls Soccer (Varsity/ Jr. Varsity)
Wrestling (Varsity/ Jr. Varsity)
Swimming
Tennis (Varsity, Jr. Varsity, & Freshman)
Baseball (Varsity, Jr. Varsity, & Freshman)
dance

Notable alumni
 Jim Criner – football coach
 Eduardo Garcia - former Coachella mayor, Assemblyman
 Benjamin Montoya - U.S. Navy rear admiral
 Alan O'Day – singer songwriter
 Joe Ortiz - Radio-Television Talk Show host, published author
 Raul Ruiz - congressman

References

External links
 Official website
 Historical Photos of Coachella Valley High School

Educational institutions established in 1916
High schools in Riverside County, California
Public high schools in California
1916 establishments in California
Coachella Valley